The "Langtang Mafia" is a rumored clique of military men from Langtang, Plateau State who hold or have held positions of power in the Nigerian government. The term is often used in reference to the 1985 – 1993 Babangida junta. Purported members have included Lt Gen Joshua Dogonyaro (retired, deceased), Lt Gen Jeremiah Useni (retired), Gen Domkat Bali (retired, deceased), Brig Gen John Nanzip Shagaya (retired and former Senator, deceased), and Lt Gen Muhammad A. Najib (retired) as well.

See also
Yakubu Gowon, another Nigerian leader accused of being involved with the Langtang Mafia

References 

Politics of Nigeria